Dover-Sherborn High School, or DSHS, is a regional public high school in the town of Dover, Massachusetts, United States. It serves students from the towns of Dover and Sherborn, and is the senior school of the Dover-Sherborn Public School District, housing grades 9 through 12. It also hosts some METCO students.  It is rated by Boston Magazine as the top High School in Massachusetts

History

Until the 1960s Dover and Sherborn sent their high school students to neighboring towns' high schools (Needham for Dover, Framingham for Sherborn). By the 1950s, the population boom was making it difficult for those schools to accept outside students, and the two towns created a regional school district. The first building was built on Farm Street in 1962.  As the population continued to increase, the current high school was built on the same campus and completed in 1968.  In 2004, a $43 million renovation on the campus was completed, which included a renovation of the high school building, the razing of the middle school (the original high school building) and the new construction of the middle school. The other schools in the district are Dover Sherborn Middle School (DSMS), Pine Hill School and Chickering School. The current principal of Dover Sherborn High school is Ann Dever-Keegan, accompanied by assistant principal Dawn Fattore.

In March 2020, the unprecedented disruptions of the COVID-19 pandemic caused the school to transition to remote learning for the remainder of the academic year.

Academics
Academically, the Dover-Sherborn High School has been historically ranked as one of Massachusetts' top-performing public schools. For example, in 2015, "Newsweek" magazine ranked Dover-Sherborn High School as the 16th best high school in the country. In 2014, Boston Magazine rated Dover-Sherborn High School as the best public school in Greater Boston. From 2011 to 2019, Boston Magazine ranked the Dover-Sherborn School System as number one in Massachusetts. US News recognized this by including DSHS amongst the top 100 public high schools in America.

For the 2006–2007 school year, DSHS tenth-grade students ranked fourth in English and math among their peers on the Massachusetts Comprehensive Assessment System (MCAS) exam.  Ninety-six percent of the class of 2006 took the SAT I and 56% scored over 600 in the verbal section, 65% scored over 600 in the math section and 58% scored over 600 in the writing section.  About 97% of all graduates attend college or university.

Extracurricular activities
The school offers sports including American football, soccer, cross country, golf, field hockey, basketball, alpine and Nordic skiing, swimming, baseball, softball, lacrosse, indoor and outdoor track and field, tennis, ice hockey, gymnastics, and sailing.

The school is part of The Education Co-operative (TEC), which allows DSHS students to take part in internships with local companies and also enroll in TEC Classes.

The Chess Team became league champions in 2007. A DSHS student project officially represented MA State at the International Science and Engineering Fair hosted by Intel in 2006. In 2007, DSHS became home to a Siemens Competition Semifinalist.

The school's Drama Department puts on two productions each year: an autumn play and a spring musical. The program is supported by the local community through organizations such as Friends of the Performing Arts, The Mudge Foundation, The Dover-Sherborn Education Fund, and Len Schnabel of DesignLight. Theater productions are performed primarily at The Mudge Auditorium in the Lindquist Commons building. Some local productions are also performed at the Sherborn Community Center/1858 Town House. Productions include: Children of Eden, Joseph and the Amazing Technicolor Dreamcoat, Fiddler on the Roof, Seussical, The Importance of Being Earnest, Godspell, The Odd Couple, Anything Goes, Once Upon a Mattress, The Crucible, Pippin, and West Side Story. In 2018 seniors Brett Melican and Sophie Charron began a student-run drama group with a production of Jean-Paul Sartre's No Exit.

Athletics

Hall of Fame

Dover-Sherborn High School began inducting former athletes, coaches, teams, and contributors to an athletics Hall of Fame in 2018.

Class of 2018: Athletes: Patrick Bresnahan (student athlete) (2003); Molly Hoagland (1976); Jay Hughes (student athlete) (1969); KC Potts (1972); Harry Rose (student athlete) (1972); Arnold "Smokey" Whitman (1970) Coaches: William "Whitey" Davis, Boys Basketball, Boys Tennis, and Girls Tennis; Thomas Marlborough, Football Team: 1981 Boys Basketball Team

Class of 2019: Athletes: Jennifer Hodgson (Brady) (1984); Paula Majeski (1979); Christopher Pavlic (1989), Ellen Willey (Gelinas) (2002) Coach: Christopher Dubose, Boys Basketball and Girls Tennis Team: 1974 Field Hockey Contributor: Richard Wakely

Class of 2020: Athletes: Vicki Greymont (1983); Paige MacTavish (1990); Judd Smith (1992); Curt Wilson (1990) Team: 1970 Football Team Contributor: Jim Lorenzon

Championships

 Girls Soccer: League Champions (1981, 1982, 1986, 1989, 1990, 1991, 2019), Sectional Champions (2010, 2011, 2019), State Champions (2011)
 Boys Soccer: League Champions (1978, 1979, 1981, 1982, 1983, 1984, 1985, 1986, 1988, 1989, 1999, 2011, 2016, 2017), Sectional Champions (2010, 2012), State Champions (1992, 2010)
 Field Hockey: League Champions (1975, 1979, 1980, 2011, 2012, 2013, 2014, 2017 (Co-Champs), 2019, 2021 (Co-Champs)), Sectional Champions (2013, 2014, 2019), State Champions (2019)
 Girls Cross Country: League Champions (2011 (Co-Champs), 2013, 2018, 2021), League Meet Champions (2010, 2011), Divisional Champions (2010, 2011)
 Boys Cross Country: League Champions (2018, 2019), League Meet Champions (2018)
 Golf: League Champions (1984, 2018, 2019, 2021), Sectional Champions (2013, 2014, 2015, 2017, 2018, 2021)
 Football: League Champions (1970, 1978, 2021)

 Boys Basketball: League Champions (1965–66, 1966–67, 1967–68, 1968–1969, 1969–1970, 1972-1973 (??), 1977–1978, 1978–1979, 1979–1980, 1980–1981, 1987–1988, 1988–1989, 1993–1994, 1994–1995, 2004–2005 (Co-Champs)), Sectional Champions (1979-1980, 1980–1981, 1992–1993, 1993–1994, 2018–2019), State Champions (1980-1981, 2018–2019)
 Boys Indoor Track: League Champions (2017-2018, 2018–2019, 2019–2020)
 Boys Ice Hockey: League Champions (1981-1982, 1982–1983, 1990–1991, 2009–2010)
 Boys Alpine: League Champions (1985-1986, 1987–1988, 1988–1989, 1989–1990, 1991–1992, 1992–1993, 1993–1994, 1999–2000, 2000–2001, 2002–2003, 2003–2004, 2004–2005, 2009–2010, 2010–2011, 2011–2012, 2012–2013, 2013–2014, 2014–2015), State Champions (1981-1982 (??), 1985–1986, 2014–2015)
 Girls Alpine: League Champions (2009-2010, 2010–2011, 2011–2012, 2012–2013, 2013–2014)
 Boys Nordic Ski: League Champions (2009-2010, 2010–2011, 2011–2012, 2012–2013, 2014–2015, 2015–2016)
 Girls Nordic Ski: League Champions (2009-2010, 2010–2011, 2011–2012)

 Boys Track and Field: League Champions (1970, 1973, 1974, 1979, 1982, 1983, 1984, 1985, 1986, 2017, 2018, 2019, 2021)
 Girls Track and Field: League Champions (2018)
 Girls Tennis: League Champions (1973, 1976, 1977, 1978, 1979, 1980, 1981, 1982, 1983, 1988, 1990, 1992, 1993, 1994, 1995, 1996, 1997, 1998, 1999, 2008, 2009, 2010, 2015, 2018, 2019, 2021), Sectional Champions (1994, 2009), State Champions (1994, 2009)
 Boys Tennis: League Champions (1973, 1975, 1976, 1977, 1978, 1979, 1982, 1984, 1985, 1986, 1988, 1989, 1990, 1999, 2000, 2001, 2006, 2007, 2008, 2009, 2010, 2011, 2013, 2015, 2016, 2017, 2018, 2019, 2021), Sectional Champions (1985, 2008, 2015, 2016, 2017, 2018, 2021), State Champions (1985)
 Boys Lacrosse: League Champions (2011, 2012 (Co-Champs), 2013, 2016 (Co-Champs), 2017 (Co-Champs), 2018, 2019, 2021), Sectional Champions (2014, 2015, 2016, 2017, 2018, 2019, 2021), State Champions (2012, 2013, 2015, 2016, 2019, 2021)
 Girls Lacrosse: League Champions (2018, 2021), Sectional Champions (2021), State Champions (2021)
 Sailing: League Champions (2011)

Notable alumni

 Dan Bennett, Class of 1980, defense attorney, current Massachusetts Secretary of Public Safety and Security
 Paul Calello, Class of 1979, chairman Credit Suisse
 Eli Dershwitz, Class of 2014, Under-20 World Saber Champion, and US Olympic saber fencer
 Stephanie Deshpande, Class of 1993, contemporary American painter
 Kenny Florian, Class of 1994, retired professional mixed martial artist for the Ultimate Fighting Championship, Fox/UFC analyst
 Dan Itse, Class of 1976, engineer, inventor, and member of the New Hampshire House of Representatives
 Marilyn Mosby, Class of 1998, lawyer, State's Attorney for Baltimore City
 Chad Urmston, Class of 1994, singer-songwriter of Dispatch and State Radio

References

External links
 

Schools in Norfolk County, Massachusetts
Public high schools in Massachusetts